Coming Home to You is a studio album released by English singer Michael Ball. It was released on 22 March 2019 through Decca Records. The album peaked at number one on the UK Albums Chart.

Critical reception
Writing for BroadwayWorld, Amanda Prahl wrote "It's a shame that the album has these moments, because it really is a pleasant experience for the most part. Ball's love for the music is always evident, and his willingness to branch out into a different sound and into original sounds should be applauded. I only wish that the end results had been a little bit better-crafted. Ball deserves better - and so do fans."

Commercial performance
On 29 March 2019, the album debuted at number one on the UK Albums Chart. Coming Home to You is Michael Ball's fourth UK number one album, his first solo number one album in the UK since his self-titled debut album in 1992. Talking to the Official Charts Company, he said, "It's the most exciting news! Thank you so much for supporting the album, to the fans who've connected with it and bought it. The hard work has been worth it and this is just the icing on the cake. Amazing!"

Track listing
All songs produced by Nick Patrick and Michael Ball.

Charts

Release history

References

2019 albums
Michael Ball albums
Decca Records albums